Canal+ Drama was a Scandinavian premium television channel showing a drama movies and television shows. The channel was previously known as Canal+ Mix.
It is replaced by C More Emotion.

References 

Pan-Nordic television channels
TV4 AB

Defunct television channels in Sweden
Defunct television channels in Norway
Defunct television channels in Denmark
Defunct television channels in Finland
Television channels and stations established in 2006
Television channels and stations disestablished in 2011